Jat Sikh (also known by the more conventional endonym Jatt Sikh) are an ethnoreligious group and a sub-group of the Jat people and the Sikh religious group from the Indian subcontinent. They are one of the dominant communities in the Punjab owing to their large land holdings.

They form an estimated 21%–25% of the population of the Indian state of Punjab. They form at least half of the Sikh population in Punjab, with some sources estimating them to be about 60% to 66% of the Sikh population.

History

Initially, some Jats started to follow the teachings of Guru Nanak, which did much to remove social barriers created by the sāvarṇa caste society. Jats were previously indifferent towards deep religious affairs.

While followers important to Sikh tradition like Baba Buddha were among the earliest significant historical Sikh figures, and significant numbers of conversions occurred as early as the time of Guru Angad (1504-1552), the first large-scale conversions of Jats is commonly held to have begun during the time of Guru Arjan (1563-1606). While touring the countryside of eastern Punjab, he founded several important towns like Tarn Taran Sahib, Kartarpur, and Hargobindpur which functioned as social and economic hubs, and together with the community-funded completion of the Darbar Sahib to house the Guru Granth Sahib and serve as a rallying point and center for Sikh activity, established the beginnings of a self-contained Sikh community, which was especially swelled with the region's Jat peasantry. They formed the vanguard of Sikh resistance against the Mughal Empire from the 18th century onwards.

It has been postulated, though inconclusively, that the increased militarisation of the Sikh panth following the martyrdom of Guru Arjan (beginning during the era of Guru Hargobind and continuing after) and its large Jat presence may have reciprocally influenced each other.

At least eight of the 12 Sikh Misls (Sikh confederacies) were led by Jat Sikhs, who would form the vast majority of Sikh chiefs.

According to censuses in gazetteers published during the colonial period in the early 20th century, further waves of Jat conversions, from Hinduism to Sikhism, continued during the preceding decades. The relationship between the Hindu, Muslim and Sikh communities of the Punjab region, and between communities such as the Jats and the Rajputs, has been ambiguous over many centuries. The various groups often claim similar origins while asserting their distinctiveness.

Influence of Sikhism on Jats
Over 60% of Sikhs belong to the Jat caste, which is an agrarian agriculture caste. According to Santokh S. Anant, Jatts, Rajputs, and Thakurs are at the top of the caste hierarchy in most of the north Indian villages, surpassing Brahmins. Assigning vaishya varṇa to Jatts, he notes that they perform the dual duties of kshatriyas and vaishyas (soldiering and agriculture) in the Punjab region. Irfan Habib has argued that Sikhism did much to uplift the social status of Jat people, who were previously regarded in the Punjab as being of shudra or vaishya status in the Hindu ritual ranking system of varṇa.

Kishan Singh says:

Army recruits
Major A.E Barstow comments, that due to their diet and their fondness for wrestling and weightlifting, they possessed good physical attributes for soldiery. According to R. W. Falcon, Jat Sikhs (alongside other Sikhs) were seen as a good source for recruitment. According to Captain A. H. Bingley they were particularly loyal soldiers.

The Jat Sikh community has constituted an important source of recruits for the Indian Army. Many serve in the Indian Army, including the Jat Regiment, Sikh Regiment, Rajputana Rifles and the Grenadiers, where they have won many of the highest military awards for gallantry and bravery.

Agriculture 

In Punjab (India), Jat Sikhs are associated with agricultural pursuits and land ownership.  They own more than 80%, and possibly as much as 95% of available agricultural land in Punjab. They often reside in the rural areas, and are economically influential in the state.

Clans 
Jat Sikhs have various clans, known as a got (clan or sub-caste; gotra in Hindi), which come under a particular zaat (tribe or caste; jati in Hindi), in Punjabi. These clans generally claim descent from a common male ancestor, are usually exogamous (with some exceptions), and historically entire villages, and even clusters of villages, were often inhabited by entirely by a single clan. The purpose for this was to provide protection for members of a clan by watching over each-other and uniting as a common group against any potential adversary. Another reason is that members of a clan socially preferred their neighbours to also be from the same background as them. Some Jat Sikh clans overlap with Hindu and Muslim Jat clans and clans may also be shared with other caste groups, such as Rajputs. Clans can be further subdivided by muhin (sub-clan or locality) and patti (street).

List of common Jat Sikh clans 

 Aulakh
 Bains
 Baiks
 Bajwa
 Bal
 Bhalli
 Bharai
 Bhullar
 Brar
 Buttar
 Chahal
 Chatha
 Cheema
 Deol
 Dhaliwal
 Dhillon
 Dhindsa
 Dhingra
 Gandhi
 Gill
 Grewal
 Ghuman
 Her
 Kahlon
 Kang
 Karg
 Kars
 Khaira
 Maan
 Margat
 Mahal
 Mangat
 Odi
 Pannu
 Pavun
 Punia
 Randhawa
 Saharia
 Sahi
 Sandhu
 Sara
 Sarai
 Sidhu
 Sohal
 Toor
 Virk
 Virla
 Warraich

Notable people
 Ranjit Singh, the Jat Sikh Emperor of the Sikh Empire
 Nawab Kapur Singh, leader of Singhpuria Misl.
 Baba Deep Singh first head of Misl Shaheedan Tarna Dal.
 Kahn Singh Nabha, Sikh scholar
Heera Singh Sandhu, founder of Nakai Misl
Sada Kaur, chief of the Kanhaiya Misl
Datar Kaur, queen consort of Maharaja Ranjit Singh
Jind Kaur, regent of the Sikh Empire

See also
Jat people
Khalsa
Misl

Notes

References

Further reading 

Social groups of Punjab, India
Jat
Sikh communities
Punjabi tribes